Jose Reginaldo Vital (born 29 February 1976) is a former Brazilian football player.

Club statistics

2012
Atualmente joga futebol amador no Inter de Campo Largo

References

External links

1976 births
Living people
Brazilian footballers
Campeonato Brasileiro Série A players
J1 League players
J2 League players
Gamba Osaka players
Hokkaido Consadole Sapporo players
Club Athletico Paranaense players
Paraná Clube players
Associação Atlética Ponte Preta players
Coritiba Foot Ball Club players
Brazilian expatriate footballers
Expatriate footballers in Japan
Association football midfielders